Kerno may refer to:

 Kerno, New South Wales, Australia, a locality and civil parish
 Ivan S. Kerno (1891–1961), Czechoslovak lawyer and diplomat

See also
 Kernos, ancient Greek pottery
 Kern (disambiguation)